Jiang (/Pinyin: Jiǎng) was a vassal state that existed during the Zhou dynasty until the middle Spring and Autumn period. In 617 BC it was annexed by the state of Chu.

The state was established right after Duke of Zhou allocated his forth son Bo Ling to a piece of land in Gushi County, Henan. Bo Ling later used the state name as his own surname.

References

Ancient Chinese states
States and territories established in the 11th century BC
States and territories disestablished in the 7th century